Niederndorf is a municipality in the Kufstein district in the Austrian state of Tyrol located 7 km north of Kufstein and 2 km north above Ebbs near the border to Bavaria, Germany. The main source of income is agriculture. The village was mentioned for the first time in documents in 1230.

References

External links
 Official website

Cities and towns in Kufstein District